Liberty (also known as Liberty, A Daughter of the USA) is a 1916 American Western film serial directed by Jacques Jaccard and Henry MacRae, and was the first purely Western serial ever made.  The film is now presumed to be lost. It is one of the most popular serials of all time.

Plot
Liberty Horton, an American heiress, is kidnapped by a Mexican rebel and ransomed to fund his rebellion.

Cast
 Marie Walcamp as Liberty Horton
 Jack Holt as Captain Rutledge
 Eddie Polo as Pedro
 G. Raymond Nye as Pancho Lopez
 Neal Hart as Captain Winston
 Bertram Grassby as Manuel Leon
 Maude Emory as Theresa
 L. M. Wells as Jose Leon
 Charles Brinley as Alvarez
 Tom London as (as Leonard Clapham)
 Roy Stewart
 Hazel Buckham

Production
Liberty, a Daughter of the USA was the first purely Western serial, although Western elements were included in earlier serials such as The Perils of Pauline (1914). A print of Liberty was one of the primary footage sources used for the compilation film The Revenge of Pancho Villa (1930–36).

See also
 List of film serials
 List of film serials by studio
 List of lost films

References

External links

 
 

1916 films
1916 lost films
1916 Western (genre) films
American silent serial films
American black-and-white films
Films directed by Jacques Jaccard
Films directed by Henry MacRae
Lost American films
Lost Western (genre) films
Silent American Western (genre) films
Universal Pictures film serials
1910s American films
1910s English-language films